The 1974–75 season was the 95th season of competitive football by Rangers.

Overview
Rangers played a total of 42 competitive matches during the 1974–75 season. Rangers won the final Scottish Football League Division One title before it was rebranded as the Scottish Premier Division. They also stopped Celtic's quest for ten-in-a-row. The decisive championship match came on 29 March 1975, Rangers needed a point away to Hibernian and that's exactly what they got. The Edinburgh club finished second to Rangers with Celtic back in third, a full eleven points behind.

The cup competitions however, provided little success as Rangers crashed out of the Scottish Cup in the third round to Aberdeen and could not progress past the sectional round in the League Cup.

There was no competitive European football that season. However, Rangers returned to Camp Nou, Barcelona to play for the Joan Gamper Trophy. They defeated Athletic Bilbao but lost 4–1 to the hosts in the final.

Results
All results are written with Rangers' score first.

Scottish First Division

Scottish Cup

League Cup

Texaco Cup

Appearances

See also
 1974–75 in Scottish football
 1974–75 Scottish Cup
 1974–75 Scottish League Cup

References 

Rangers F.C. seasons
Rangers
Scottish football championship-winning seasons